Saint Anthony's Catholic Church is a historic Roman Catholic church building at 306 S. Parker in Bryan, Texas.

The Romanesque Revival-style building was constructed in 1927 and added to the National Register of Historic Places in 1987.

See also

National Register of Historic Places listings in Brazos County, Texas

References

Roman Catholic churches in Texas
Churches on the National Register of Historic Places in Texas
Churches in Brazos County, Texas
Bryan, Texas
National Register of Historic Places in Brazos County, Texas